The NZRL Bartercard Premiership was a six-team rugby league competition that ran in 2008 and 2009. It replaced the now-defunct Bartercard Cup competition as the highest level of rugby league in New Zealand. Matches have been broadcast on SKY Network Television and Māori Television. In 2009 the competition was mirrored by Under 18 and Under 16 grade competitions. The competition was replaced by the seven-team National Zonal Competition in 2010.

Teams
In both season, 6 teams represented different regions of New Zealand. The league operated on a single group system, with no divisions or conferences and no relegation and promotion from other leagues.

The 6 regions which competed in the Bartercard Premiership are given below:

The map below shows the locations of the 6 competing provinces within New Zealand:

List of premiers
Two seasons of the Bartercard Premiership were contested, the most successful club in the short history of the competition being Canterbury.

History

2008

The inaugural representative season started on the weekend of August 23 and 24, 2008. The first Grand Final was held at Mount Smart Stadium on  September 28.

2009

The second season of the Bartercard Premiership saw an extension of the competition to two junior grades; an under 16s and 18s competition.

In the Seniors competition, Canterbury achieved their first Premiership in the new competition in a rematch of the 2008 final, defeating Auckland at Rugby League Park, Christchurch.

The 2009 season was the last competition contested with this name and format, with the Premiership being replaced by the National Zonal Competition in 2010.

References

External links
 NZ Rugby League
 LeagueNet NZ
 

Rugby league competitions in New Zealand